Trop la Classe is a French television show adapted from As the Bell Rings. It is on the Disney Channel and every Sunday on one cable broadcast. It is a French adaption of the Disney Channel Italy Original Series Quelli dell'intervallo.

The show's 5th season (Trop la Classe Verte !) has begun airing on February 24, 2010.

Characters
 Prem: Guilhem Simon
Prem is a whiz kid who is rather kind and helps his needy classmates.
 Dunk: Manon Azem
She is depicted as the athletic and tomboyish girl. Her best friend is Nico. 
 Charlotte: Nina Melo
Charlotte is viewed as an annoyance as she cannot stay quiet.
 Valentine: Marieke Bouillette
Valentine is the most popular girl of the college. She is very concerned about appearances and finds it a priority that hers is perfect. All boys fall for her but the girls don't appreciate her massive ego and the curt reply. Her superiority complex creates great tension with Juliette and she is not very intelligent. 
 Nico: Côme Levin
Nico is often seen as the class clown and is known for mischief. He often tells jokes which he finds funny but are not appreciated by his friends. His best friend is Dunk.
 Cleo: Garance Mazureck
 Theo: Gregory Gempp
 Arthur: Arthur Ligerot
 Juliette: Juliette Lopes Benites (Season 2)
 Spy: Paul Alexander Bardel
 Thomas: Gauthier Battouen (Season 2)
 Romain: (Season 3)
 Jeanne: Sophie Chen (Part of season 1) 
 Dread: François Civil (Season 1)
 Nina: Cerise Bouvet
 Alice:
 Marine: (Season 3)
 Hugo:

Disney Channels Worldwide original programming
French children's television series
French-language Disney Channel original programming
2000s high school television series
2000s teen sitcoms
Television series about teenagers